Ashokavanam is a 1978 Indian Malayalam film, directed by M. Krishnan Nair and produced by T. E. Vasudevan. The film stars Jagathy Sreekumar, MG Soman, Sudheer and Sukumaran in the lead roles. The film has musical score by V. Dakshinamoorthy.

Cast
Sudheer
Sukumaran
M. G. Soman
Jagathy Sreekumar 
Adoor Bhasi 
Jose Prakash  
Unnimary 
Balan K. Nair   
Vijayalalitha

Soundtrack
The music was composed by V. Dakshinamoorthy and the lyrics were written by Sreekumaran Thampi and Vellanad Narayanan.

References

External links
 

1978 films
1970s Malayalam-language films
Films directed by M. Krishnan Nair